The men's 1500 metres event at the 1948 Olympic Games took place August 4 and August 6. Thirty-six athletes from 22 nations competed. The maximum number of athletes per nation had been set at 3 since the 1930 Olympic Congress. The final was won by Swede Henry Eriksson. It was Sweden's first medal in the 1500 metres; Lennart Strand took Sweden's second medal 0.6 seconds later. Willem Slijkhuis earned bronze, with the Netherlands also receiving its first medal in the 1500 metres.

Background

This was the 11th appearance of the event, which is one of 12 athletics events to have been held at every Summer Olympics. None of the finalists from the pre-war 1936 Games returned. The 1500 metres landscape had shifted strongly towards Sweden during World War II; the nation had never won an Olympic medal in the sport before the war but was aiming for a sweep in 1948 despite Arne Andersson and Gunder Hägg being declared ineligible professionals. The team in London was Lennart Strand (1946 European champion, world list leader in 1947), Henry Eriksson (1946 European runner-up, second on world list in 1947), and Gösta Bergkvist (third on the world list in 1947).

Iceland, Ireland, South Korea, and Trinidad and Tobago each made their first appearance in the event. The United States made its 11th appearance, the only nation to have competed in the men's 1500 metres at each Games to that point.

Competition format

The competition consisted of two rounds, the format used since 1908. The number of semifinals remained at four, with between 7 and 9 runners in each. The top three runners in each heat advanced to the final, resulting in the typical 12-man final race.

Records

These were the standing world and Olympic records prior to the 1948 Summer Olympics.

No world or Olympic records were set during the competition.

Schedule

All times are British Summer Time (UTC+1).

Results

Semifinals

Semifinal 1

Semifinal 2

Semifinal 3

Semifinal 4

Final

The results of the final past the first six places are disputed. The Official Report lists the times and places of the top six runners, but all others are marked simply as "also competed." The table below presents the results as shown by Olympedia, "based on information from Richard Hymans, British athletics statistical expert" and "supplemented . . . by various descriptions from multiple national sources, including a Swedish radio report of the finish of the race, which definitively gives Garay as placing seventh." Below the main table, alternative placements are shown.

 Alternative placements

References

Notes
Organising Committee for the XIV Olympiad, The (1948). The Official Report of the Organising Committee for the XIV Olympiad. LA84 Foundation. Retrieved 4 September 2016.

Athletics at the 1948 Summer Olympics
1500 metres at the Olympics
Men's events at the 1948 Summer Olympics